Lake Isle may refer to:
Cory Lake Isles, neighborhood of Tampa, Florida
Isle Lake (Alberta), lake in Alberta, Canada
Lake Innisfree, lake in New Rochelle, New York, also known as Lake Isle
Lake Isle of Innisfree, poem by William Butler Yeats
Lake Isle, Alberta, community in Alberta, Canada
Lake, Isle of Wight, civil parish on the Isle of Wight, England
Lake of the Isles, lake in Minneapolis, Minnesota

See also